Parwanipur  is a village development committee in Sarlahi District in the Janakpur Zone of south-eastern Nepal.  It is 5 km up from Mahendra Highway At the time of the 1991 Nepal census it had a population of 6162 people living in 1122 individual households.

References

External links
UN map of the municipalities of Sarlahi  District

Populated places in Sarlahi District